Thangachimadam is a village in Rameswaram island in the state of Tamil Nadu in India.

Geography
Rameshwaram is separated from the mainland by Pamban channel.

Economy
The main occupation of people live here is fishing and its allied occupations.  Also coconut and jasmine farming activities exist at a considerable level. Jasmine nurseries abound in this coastal hamlet although fishing is the predominant activity. Around 300 farmers cultivate the exotic jasmine variety that is known for its unique fragrance. Small nurseries cover at least 150 acres in the village. Jasmine is almost synonymous with the temple city of Madurai, but the famed Madurai malli has its origins in this little known village of Thangachimadam on Rameswaram island.

Climate

Thangachimadam has a hot tropical climate temperature ranging from 25 °C (min) to 46 °C (max) and the relative humidity is high at 79% on an average and it ranges between 80% to 90%.

Winter: Max. 30 °C Min. 25 °C, rainfall: 500 mm

Communication
Under the joint ISRO-MSSRF Village Resource Centre programme- ISRO has sanctioned satellite
connectivity to Thiruvaiyaru in Tanjore, Sembatty in Dindigul district and Thangachimadam in
Ramnad district. These centers will facilitate teleconferences between farm and fishing families at these locations and MSSRF scientists as well as with leading experts in the area of health, education, agriculture, fisheries, marketing and disaster management.

Education

 Govt Higher Secondary School.
 Mandapam Union Primary School
 Vivekanda Vidyalaya Matriculation School.
 St. Theresa primary school.
 Holy cross girls higher secondary school.

 Yagappa High School

 Kamaraj high school.
 King of Kings Matriculation School
 Infant Jesus Matriculation school.
 Al Hadi Primary school.
 st james primary and nursery school
 St Anne's Matriculation Higher Secondary school
 Udhayam Polytechnic College

Notable people 

 S. A. Chandrasekhar, Tamil film director
 Former President of India Dr. A. P. J. Abdul Kalam's resting place is at Ariyankundu Bus stop near Thangachimadam.

External links
 Thangachimadam Maligai  Seedling

Villages in Ramanathapuram district